Robert Kalich is an American novelist, journalist, and producer. He is the author of non-fiction books and novels, best known for his national best-seller, "The Handicapper" (1981) a novel about an obsessive gambler published by Crown Publishing Group. Robert was born and lives in New York where he co-directs a film company with his twin brother Richard Kalich.

Early years
Kalich was born and raised in New York City.

Works
Kalich started his career a journalist at the New York Daily Mirror. In 1969, he compiled The Baseball Rating Handbook.

. Stepping outside of the world of sports that same year, he also wrote The Negro Manifesto.

The Baseball Rating Handbook
In 1969 Kalich released his first book, The Baseball Rating Handbook.

The Basketball Rating Handbook
In 1970, Kalich released his follow-up to The Baseball Rating Handbook with his second book, The Basketball Rating Handbook.

The Handicapper
In 1981, he wrote The Handicapper, which became a national best-seller.

The Investigation of Ariel Warning
In 2012, he penned The Investigation of Ariel Warning.

David Lazar
In November 2019, Kalich released his novel David Lazar, based loosely on his own life experiences.

The Kalich Organization
Kalich co-founded The Kalich Organization, a film and theatrical company with his twin brother, Richard Kalich.

Personal life
Kalich lives with his wife and son in New York City, NY and North Salem, NY. Robert's twin brother Richard Kalich is also a writer, who has been nominated for both the National Book Award and the Pulitzer Prize.

References

Living people
20th-century American novelists
21st-century American novelists
Novelists from New York (state)
American male novelists
Postmodern writers
20th-century American male writers
21st-century American male writers
Year of birth missing (living people)